NZDA may stand for:

 Dargaville Aerodrome, an airport ner Dargaville
 New Zealand Dental Association, a dental association in New Zealand